Air Vice Marshal Michael Guy Lloyd,  was a senior commander in the Royal Air Force who served as the Air Officer Commanding No. 22 Group from 2011 until 2014.

RAF career
Lloyd served with No. 18 Squadron from 1981 to 1985. Promoted to air commodore in 2004, Lloyd became Director of Defence Publicity in 2004, Director of Reserve Forces and Cadets in 2006, and Director of Corporate Affairs in 2008 before becoming Air Secretary in March 2009. In 2011, he became the Air Officer Commanding No. 22 Group.

Honours 
He was appointed Companion of the Order of the Bath (CB) in the 2013 Birthday Honours.

References

|-

Companions of the Order of the Bath
Living people
Royal Air Force air marshals
Royal Air Force personnel of the Falklands War
Year of birth missing (living people)